Triplophysa griffithii is a small species of stone loach from Afghanistan and China. It grows to  total length.

References

griffithii
Fish of Afghanistan
Freshwater fish of China
Fish described in 1868
Taxa named by Albert Günther
Taxobox binomials not recognized by IUCN